Bursatella is a genus of sea slugs or sea hares, marine opisthobranch gastropod mollusks in the family Aplysiidae, the sea hares.

Species
Species within the genus Bursatella include:

References

Aplysiidae
Gastropod genera